The Buell Children's Museum is a children's museum in Pueblo, Colorado, United States that offers hands-on exhibits focusing on the arts, science and history.

The Museum is accredited as a part of The Sangre de Cristo Arts and Conference Center by the American Alliance of Museums (AAM), and is affiliated with the Association of Children's Museums.

History

The Buell Children's Museum is a part of The Sangre de Cristo Arts & Conference Center which opened in 1972, with funding provided by the Economic Development Administration and Pueblo County.

In 1982, an expansion, funded by Puebloan Helen T. White, added three galleries, a gift shop and a small precursor children’s museum.

In 2000, a further expansion added the 12,000 square-foot, two-level Buell Children's Museum and the Jackson Sculpture Garden. The Buell Children’s Museum offers 7,500 square feet of interactive gallery space, a theater, a café and a gift shop.

Exhibits

The Reilly Family Gallery offers changing, hands-on exhibitions.
Sensations is a high-tech, multi-sensory exhibit in which visitors activate lights, sound clips and videos.
The El Pomar Magic Carpet Theater allows visitors to watch a program or star in their own theatrical production.
The Artrageous Studio allows visitors to create arts & crafts.
The Buell Baby Barn has activities for those under four, in a barnyard theme.

Awards

In 2002 Child Magazine recognized the museum as the number two arts-related children’s
museum in the country.

In 2004, the museum was named the winner of the Award of Excellence in Arts & Humanities
by the El Pomar Foundation.

Voted the Best Museum in Pueblo by The Pueblo Chieftain readers seven years in a row - 2012, 2013, 2014, 2015, 2016 & 2017.

References

Museums in Pueblo County, Colorado
Buildings and structures in Pueblo, Colorado
Tourist attractions in Pueblo, Colorado
Museums established in 2000
Children's museums in Colorado